Stan Statham (April 7, 1939 – August 1, 2020) was an American broadcaster and politician from California. He was elected as a Republican to the California State Assembly in 1976, and served until 1994.

Statham was known as an advocate of the State of Jefferson.

Biography
Stan Statham was born on April 7, 1939, in the then-rural community of Chico, California. After a single enlistment in the Army in Military Intelligence, he worked in radio and banking until landing the job of news director and nightly news anchor at KHSL-TV, the Chico CBS affiliate. For 12 years, Statham ran news operations; he also conducted several on-air interviews of politicians and celebrities.

Statham then took a nearly 20-year diversion from the news and broadcasting business to serve in the California State Assembly from 1976 to 1994.  During that time, he was known as a crusader for the rights of the north state and rural communities.  Because of his efforts to curb drunk driving and reduce traffic fatalities, Statham was appointed a lifetime member of the Presidential Commission on Drunk Driving, an honor bestowed upon only 26 citizens.

Statham ran for lieutenant governor in 1994, losing in the GOP primary to state Senator Cathie Wright.  Statham then returned to broadcasting assuming the position of president and CEO of the California Broadcasters Association. As president of the CBA, he has moderated California gubernatorial debates for many years, including the much-publicized 2003 debate preceding Arnold Schwarzenegger’s initial election as governor.  In 2015 he retired from the California Broadcasters Association

He was found dead on August 1, 2020, at the age of 81.

References

External links

Republican Party members of the California State Assembly
American broadcasters
1939 births
2020 deaths
People from Chico, California
Military personnel from California
Radio personalities from California
20th-century American politicians